Hot House is the seventh recording by vibraphonist Gary Burton and pianist Chick Corea released in March 2012 from Concord Jazz label.
It received Grammy Award nominations in Best Jazz Instrumental Album, and the title track "Hot House" won the Best Improvised Jazz Solo.

Reception 

The Allmusic review by Thom Jurek awarded the album four stars and states, "This is collaboration in its purest and most elegant form."

Thom Jurek of Allmusic wrote "This time out, Corea and Burton picked pieces by some of their favorite composers -- mostly from the jazz world, of course -- yet chose compositions that were less than obvious... The duo's approach in wedding mainstream and modern jazz (often inside the same tune) will appeal mostly to fans of the duo's previous six recordings. That said, Hot House is a further example of the nearly symbiotic language they've developed over the past 40 years, and is a stellar example of masterful dialogic articulation and execution. This is collaboration in its purest and most elegant form."

Track listing
 "Can't We Be Friends" (Paul James, Kay Swift) – 7:26 
 "Eleanor Rigby" (John Lennon, Paul McCartney) – 7:01 
 "Chega de Saudade" (Antônio Carlos Jobim, Vinícius de Moraes) – 10:46
 "Time Remembered" (Bill Evans) – 6:13 
 "Hot House" (Tadd Dameron) – 3:54
 "Strange Meadow Lark" (Dave Brubeck) – 7:05
 "Light Blue" (Thelonious Monk) – 6:04
 "Once I Loved" (Antônio Carlos Jobim, Vinícius de Moraes) – 7:22
 "My Ship" (Ira Gershwin, Kurt Weill) – 11:53 
 "Mozart Goes Dancing" (Chick Corea) – 7:13

Personnel
Musicians
Gary Burton — vibraphone
Chick Corea — piano
Ilmar Gavilan — violin
Melissa White — violin
Juan Miguel Hernandez — viola
Paul Wiancko — cello

Production
 Chick Corea — producer
 Gary Burton — producer
 Bill Rooney — executive producer

 Greg Calbi — mastering
 Steve Fallone — mastering
 Bernie Kirsch — engineer, mixing
 Gloria Kaba — mixing assistant
 Bob Cetti — assistant engineer
 Bob Mallory — assistant engineer
 Glenn Suyker — piano technician

 Evelyn Brechtlein — production coordination
 Dan Muse — Liner Note Coordination
 Andrew Elliott — Personal assistant
 Julie Rooney — art coordinator, photography
 Marc Bessant — graphics
 Ernest Gregory — photography

Charts

References 

Gary Burton albums
Chick Corea albums
2012 albums